TNW (The Next Web) is a website and annual series of conferences focused on new technology and start-up companies in Europe. The Next Web company was established in 2006 by co-founders Boris Veldhuijzen van Zanten and Patrick de Laive in Amsterdam, Netherlands, and a technology news website of the same name was started in 2009. TNW's reporting has been sourced by Wired, Mashable, and the Huffington Post, among others.

On 5 March 2019, the Financial Times purchased a majority stake in TNW. On September 6, 2021, former CEO, Boris stepped down and handed the position to Myrthe van de Erve who was the former COO.

According to de Laive, it took one year for thenextweb.com to reach 100,000 monthly visitors, and at June 2016 it was getting 8 million to 10 million monthly visitors.

Conferences

Speakers at TNW Conferences have included Gary Vaynerchuk, Prince Constantijn of the Netherlands, and Robert Cailliau.

In 2017, The Next Web's Amsterdam conference came under fire for making misleading statements, and having a lack of transparency about paying presenters for speaking appearances, and for having a gender gap in the number of its male and female presenters, and a gender pay gap in their compensation.

In 2020 the event was fully online and for their 2021 event they held a hybrid and smaller event because of COVID-19 restrictions in the Netherlands.

See also
Consumer Electronics Show
Web Summit
Slush (event)

References

Further reading

External links
Official website
TNW Conference website
TNW Youtube

2006 establishments in the Netherlands
International conferences in the Netherlands
Internet properties established in 2008
Recurring events established in 2006
Technology websites
2019 mergers and acquisitions